José Alberto Vizcarra Nieto (16 March 1927 – 13 September 1976) was a Peruvian basketball player. He competed in the men's tournament at the 1948 Summer Olympics.

References

External links
 

1927 births
1976 deaths
Peruvian men's basketball players
1954 FIBA World Championship players
Olympic basketball players of Peru
Basketball players at the 1948 Summer Olympics
People from Moquegua Region
20th-century Peruvian people